The Green Student Council is a non-profit organisation concerning local environmental problems that was founded in August 1993, in Hong Kong, China. Members include accountants, teachers and lawyers, as well as university students. They are expected to bring the idea of environmental protection to the fields they are in.

The organisation organises gatherings for members to promote public awareness of environmental issues through publications and the Internet, as well as to meet and share with like-minded people.

For 'the promotion of public awareness', various campaigns are held, such as demonstrations and relay runs, so as to raise public awareness and to convey green messages to the government departments.

For 'informing the public', the council frequently updates the information concerning environmental protection in their webpage. It also publicises its bulletin regularly.

For 'the maintenance of friendship', the group organises activities like field trips, hiking, camping, and meeting. Through these activities, the members can gather regularly. They can also understand existing environmental problems more thoroughly, learn how to protect and appreciate the environment, and share views on how to protect nature.

Anyone who would like to join the organisation or be a volunteer in any activities can freely register on its website. There is also a forum where everyone can share their opinions.

Early history

The Green Student Council was founded in 1993 by a group of secondary school students who cared about nature. They met in the "Green Hope Scheme" (綠色希望計劃) organised by Friends of the Earth. Encouraged by Friends of the Earth, the students established the Green Secondary School Students Union, later renamed the Green Student Council.

The current president, Ho Hon Wan (何翰威), a graduate of the University of Hong Kong, is also one of the founders of the council who devoted himself to discouraging the consumption of plastic bags. In 1999, he initiated the "newspaper doesn't need plastic bag" day. It attracted a lot of attention from the media, but the government did not take up the call for a plastic bag tax. In 2003, he sent letters to PARKnSHOP and Wellcome asking them reducing the number of plastic bags being distributed but no reply was received. In 2005, the "no-plastic-bag day" that he had prepared for over 8 months was finally supported by the government. The Environment and Conservation Fund even approved about HK$100,000 to promote the council. The two supermarkets also agreed to meet the council and have a discussion about the reduction in plastic bag usage.

Activities

Reducing the use of plastic bags
In 2004, Hong Kong topped the world in the use of plastic bags, going through 33 millions daily, or about 5 bags per citizen. Australia, with a population of 20 million, used a quarter of that number while Ireland, where a plastic bag levy was introduced in 2002 for its four million people, used a third. The expense on dealing with plastic bags also reaches 40 million dollars each year.

As early as January 1998, Mr Ho had been working hard to prompt people not to overuse plastic bags. He tried to encourage people not to take an extra bag for newspaper and made suggestions to the government concerning the introduction of a plastic bag levy. Unfortunately, the response was not as satisfactory as today's and it was not until 2006 that the dream of a "No Plastic Bag Day" was realised.

Prior to the initiation of the "No Plastic Bag Day", the organisation had proposed a levy on it in October 2005. Customers were required to pay $0.5 for each plastic bag, except those used for holding food, bread and wet products as a donation for Oxfam Hong Kong. However, with some discussion and reflection, the proposal was banned.

No-Plastic Bag Day
But the council keeps on making effort in the concerned fields. In April 2006, the "No-Plastic Bag Day" (無膠袋日) was initiated and suggested to be held on the first Tuesday of each month. It aims at reducing the use of plastic bags, which causes serious damage to the environment and threatens wildlife. Another aim of the programme is to raise public awareness of environmental protection. The programme, this time, has been warmly supported by many local shops. The two major supermarkets, Wellcome and PARKnSHOP, have joined this programme along with more than 12 retail companies and 1200 shops.

Apart from commercial sectors, the Green Student Council has been attempting to extend the scheme to various educational institutes. Numerous outings, campaigns and design competitions were held in primary and secondary schools to promote their mission. So far, these efforts were well received.

The Council has also tried to promote the programme to tertiary educational institutes, but was met with little success. Although appeals were sent to all universities in Hong Kong, only the University of Hong Kong had promised to launch the programme in the campus so far. Mr Ho, Chairperson of the Green Student Council, expressed that university students, who would be the pillars of the society, should bear the responsibility of environmental protection. He hoped he could bring this message to all university students.

Aside from the "No-Plastic Bag day", in July 2006, the organisation held a relay run to raise the awareness of reducing the use of plastic bags. People holding the "no-plastic-bag" torch were required to run from Central to Tai Koo. It symbolised that the council brought the message of reducing the use of plastic bags to every district. The run was also held to remind the public about 4 July – the  "no plastic bag" day of July.

A "No-Plastic Bag Week" was also organised during the Mid-Autumn Festival in October 2006 with the Sino Group, which advocates reducing the use of plastic bags when buying moon cakes. It was strongly supported by many shops including Pappagallo, Kee-Wah, Mango Cake, Qi Chinese Restaurant and Shanghai Restaurant. Letters were also sent to all mooncake sellers asking them to post posters conveying green messages in retailing shops. Shopowners were asked to encourage citizens to bring their own bags when purchasing mooncakes in the meantime.

No Plastic Bags Day Survey Report
A survey concerning the use of plastic bags on "No Plastic Bags Day" (NPBD) had been done in early July 2006. There were 1034 supermarket customers being interviewed at the door of supermarket outlets randomly in major districts in Hong Kong e.g. Tuen Mun, Wong Tai Sin, Wan Chai.

According to survey results, responses from the NPBD were encouraging. Among the interviewed, 58% knew that the first Tuesdays of every month was NPBD. On 4 July NPBD, there was about 46% decrease in the use of plastic bags.

After NPBD was held since 15 April 75% of them had used less plastic bags. 86% of them supported the government to levy a tax on plastic bags to reduce its abused use and 82% of them agreed that it would be suitable to do it in 2007. Finally, 67% of the customers had brought their own bags for shopping.

For the detailed report, please refer to the official report.

Proposal on the plastic bag tax
As mentioned above, the Green Student Council has done a lot to propose the levy of plastic bag tax. It suggests adopting the Tai Wan's way of imposing plastic bag tax. The following are the details of the proposal:
 The government should prohibit all shops from distributing the plastic bags to customers, except some cases that have been granted exemption.
 Once a customer demands a plastic bags from any shop, the shop must charge the customer for $1 for each plastic bag.
 Each shop should pay not less than 1% of its profit tax for alleviation of pollution caused by plastic bags.
 Government's inspectors should make sudden inspection for each shop to prevent them from distributing plastic bags to their customers freely without charging them.
 Plastic bags directly used for storing fish, meat and vegetable will be exempted from being taxed.

Against air pollution
The Green Student Council also brought the issue of energy waste under the spot light. In an attempt to reduce the waste of energy and to raise awareness of ineffective air-condition filtering systems on buses, a protest was held on 25 December 2005 by its members. The organisation questioned the need of having air-conditioned buses in winter. They accused the bus company of wasting energy, causing even more serious air pollution and increasing the chance of passengers getting cold by turning on the air-conditioners in winter. With the support of Kwai Tsing District Council member Lam Siu-fai, the event took place outside the Kowloon Motor Bus depot in Lai Chi Kok. The number of buses with air-condition filtering systems was very small, with only 600 buses installed out of 4300.

In January 2006, the GSC published an article on the newspaper discussing the issue. Apart from re-stating their stance of opposing the use of air conditioning in buses in winter, they also suggested bus companies adopt the design of unfixed windows so as to allow a more flexible use of air-conditioning.

Promoting environmental protection to China
On 26 and 27 August, the Green Student Council visited Foshan, a Chinese city, to promote the reduction in the usage of plastic bags. Details about Hong Kong's No-Plastic Bag Day were introduced to the public in Foshan. Many activities were held to promote the concept of environmental conservation, including games and a sign-up campaign. Many retailers and citizens were supportive. The Green Student Council also visited Waste Treatment Centre and was interviewed by the local radio.

Lunchboxes and dining utensils in primary schools

The Green Student Council has been expressing the concern about lunchbox arrangements. It conducted a survey concerning the lunch arrangement in primary schools. 1117 students responded to the survey. About 90% of the students knew that the plastic foam lunchboxes were not environmentally friendly. 95% of them were willing to give up using those lunchboxes. 57% of students stated that they could not finish all the food in the lunch boxes.

On 6 Oct 2006, a group of students with the representatives of the Green Student Council demonstrated to the government. They demanded the setting up of rules and regulations about the lunch arrangement and lunchboxes. They hoped that the government would require schools to reduce the use of disposable dining utensils and lunch boxes. The organisation believed that these measures could help ease the solid waste problem in Hong Kong.

The use of dining utensils in primary schools has also been another concern of the council.
Generally, dining utensils made of non-recyclable materials like wood and polystyrene are used in primary schools owing to their convenience and ease of disposal. However, wood and polystyrene are so environmentally unfriendly because usage of the former indirectly destroys our forests and the latter can hardly be recycled and decomposed.

Therefore, a campaign encouraging the use of reusable dining utensils in primary schools was called by the council on 30 April this year. 500 students and parents gathered on that day and built a 3-D "spoon" using reusable dining utensils so as to convey the message of " start protecting the environment from using reusable dining utensils" 「環保午膳, 從再用餐具做起」to all primary schools.

Encouraging the public to participate in different environmental protection activities
The Green Student Council does not just organise activities, they also encourage the public to participate in environmental protection activities through the internet. For example,

 It encouraged the public to participate in the light out activity on 8 August, requiring participants to turn off the lights for 3 minutes since 8pm.
 In May 2006, it encouraged the public to be the "butterfly army" organised by the Green Power to learn more about butterflies and the natural environment in Hong Kong .
 The Green Student Council also encouraged the public to take part in an energy saving competition on 19 May. The competition was held by Friends of the Earth, but the Green Student Council also helped promote this activity to convey the message of environmental protection to the general public.

Opinions
Green Student Council's work is not just confined to organising different demonstrations and activities to raise the awareness of environmental protection. They also express their opinions towards different conservation matters in Hong Kong.

Reflection on the 2005 Policy Address

In the 2005 Policy Address, the Chief Executive claimed that Hong Kong should adopt PPP, Polluters Pay Principle, and encourage citizens to recycle. It was once criticised by Green Student Council because it was too vague. Instead, the Green Student Council asked for surcharge for every plastic bag. After one year, in 2006, the Chief Executive did not seem to have carry out any practical solution regarding what he said in 2005. As a result, the Green Student Council held a small demonstration on 8 October 2006. The organisation hoped that the government would legislate for a surcharge for every plastic bag as soon as possible.

Opinions towards the conservation policies stated in the 2006 Policy Address
In the 2006 Policy Address, Mr Tsang mentioned different kinds of environmental problems and decided to introduce different policies to tackle these problems such as air pollution.

However, the Green Student Council thought that the new conservation policies were not holistic enough. The suggested policies failed to address major problems such as solid wastes, conservation of energy, urban planning and the excessive use of plastic bags.

The Green Student Council felt especially disappointed about the policy address having no concrete proposal and timetable for the levy of plastic bags, tyres, and electronic device.

The president, Ho Hon Wan, said the society had already had consensus over the level of charges on the use of plastic bags. He commented that the Chief Executive neglected the importance of waste reduction.

Regarding the reduction in solid waste, the Green Student Council suggested the government to change all roadside rubbish bins into recycling boxes and make all newly built estates implement recycling policies on each floor.

Publicity
The Green Student Council actively promotes its mission of environmental protection through the mass media, notably by doing interviews in some radio programmes. On 17 September 2005, the President was interviewed by RTHK Radio 2. In the interview, he talked about what the organisation had been doing and the difficulties encountered when the organisation promotes the awareness of environmental protection.

They also strive hard to raise public awareness by collaborating with celebrities, politicians and other public organisations in different campaigns. Furthermore, some competitions like the slogan and poster design are held regularly to promote the message of environmental protection.

Sometimes, they give out awards to people who are concerned about the environment, such as the 10th 'Good Student Award' held in the summer 2006 which aimed to award the students who had actively participated in environmental protection activities.

The Green Student Council also uses different means of demonstration to promote the message of environmental protection. For example, a bicycle parade was held in April 2006 to promote the reduction of plastic bag usage.

Criticism

Criticism about where the donation goes
There was a rumour that the Green Student Council (GSC) misappropriated the donation raised in the "No plastic bag" day. Originally, under the scheme of "No Plastic Bag" day, customers who asked for plastic bags had to donate $0.5 to Oxfam. GSC was responsible for collecting the donation and transferring it to Oxfam.

For two "No Plastic Bag" days held on 15 April and 6 June, there were rumours that there was a great difference between the expected amount of donation and the actual one. GSC was therefore suspected to misappropriate the donation. Some anonymous letters had been sent to different media pointing out that the monthly expected donation should amount to $600,000 according to the estimation by GSC, but the actual donation turned out to be about $120,000 for April and $150,000 June. It was further stated that the donation of June was misappropriated for a cruise trip to watch dolphins.

For the donation in April, Mr Ho, the president of GSC, said their estimation of the amount of donation was based on their estimation of reduction in the amount of plastic bags. However, they did not know exactly how many plastic bags were distributed on that day in each shop. He added that some shops hadn't submitted their donation yet.

But GSC had an announcement in her homepage that all donation had been counted and transferred to Oxfam. There was a great contradiction between what GSC claimed and what was reported in news.

To prove its innocence, GSC showed all the receipts of donation in April and June from each shop and put it on their webpage. The organisation also posted a statement to clarify the procedure of collecting the donation on their webpage.

Criticism about intervening government policies

There was a criticism about intervening government policies by the Green Student Council on Apple Daily Editorial dated 23 June 2005.

It was said in the article that the role Green Student Council played was to educate the public about environmental protection. After the organisation conducted a survey about primary school students' plastic foam lunchboxes usage (please kindly refer to 'Achievements' in this entry), the organisation found many schools using plastic foam lunchboxes and therefore demanded the government to force schools to use environmentally friendly lunchboxes instead.

The organisation was said to deprive people of freedom of choice. Even the government cannot deprive its citizens of their freedom under any circumstances. It was inappropriate for an organisation to ask the government to take away the freedom of choice from the public. The author of the Editorial suggested that the Green Student Council should focus on the work of education and explain the importance of environmental protection to those schools not using environmentally friendly lunchboxes so as to persuade them to use them. It was said that the council should not try to make the government intervene in the issue.

In the reply to the article, Green Student Council agreed that as an environmental protection organisation, it should focus on the work of education. However, after the organisation had persuaded the schools to use environmentally friendly lunchboxes repeatedly, many schools still did not impose any concrete policy. As such, the organisation thought it was appropriate to demand the government to force all primary schools to use environmentally friendly lunchboxes as this was the most effective way to tackle the solid waste problem in Hong Kong.

External links
 Green Student Council

Environmental organisations based in Hong Kong